was a Japanese long-distance runner. He competed in the men's 5000 metres and men's 3000 metres steeplechase at the 1936 Summer Olympics.

References

1909 births
Year of death missing
Place of birth missing
Japanese male long-distance runners
Japanese male steeplechase runners
Olympic male long-distance runners
Olympic male steeplechase runners
Olympic athletes of Japan
Athletes (track and field) at the 1936 Summer Olympics
Japan Championships in Athletics winners
20th-century Japanese people